Renato Canova is an Italian athletics coach.

Biography
Renato Canova is well known for coaching Kenyan-born Qatari Saif Saaeed Shaheen (3000m steeplechase world record holder) along with a plethora of other great athletes including 10,000 meter runner Nicholas Kemboi (26:30.03), Dorcus Inzikuru (2005 World 3000m steeplechase Champion), Moses Mosop (2005 World Championships 10000m bronze medalist, 2007 World Cross Country Championships silver medalist, and 25000m and 30000m world record holder in 1:12:47.4 and 1:26:25.4), Florence Kiplagat (2009 World Cross Country Champion, 2010 World Half-Marathon Champion, and WR holder at the 15 km, 20 km and Half Marathon distances), Wilson Kiprop (2010 World Half-Marathon Champion and 10000m altitude world record holder in 27:26.93), Silas Kiplagat (2011 World Championships 1500m silver medalist), Sylvia Kibet (2009 and 2011 World Championships 5000m silver), Imane Merga (2011 World Cross Country Champion and 2011 World Championships 10000m bronze medalist), Abel Kirui (2009 and 2011 World Marathon Champion and Olympic silver medalist), Caleb Ndiku (2014 World Indoor 3000m Champion, 2015 World Championships 5000m silver medalist), Ronald Kwemoi (World Junior Record Holder of 1500m), Irene Cheptai (World Champion in Cross Country 2017), and Geoffrey Kirui (2017 World Championships marathon gold medalist). 

At the Olympic Games 2012 in London, athletes he coached won one silver (Abel Kirui, Marathon) and two bronze medals (Wilson Kipsang, Marathon, and Thomas Longosiwa, 5000m). At the 2017 Fukuoka Marathon, Sondre Nordstad Moen, an athlete from Norway who was coached by him following the Olympic Games in Rio, surprised the athletic world, winning against some of the best Ugandan and Kenyan athletes in a new European Record of 2:05:48.

Canova's athletes have won many medals in top international middle and long distance competitions. 

Some of his other world champion athletes include Christopher Koskei (1999 3000m steeplechase), Paul Kosgei (2002 Half-Marathon), and Saif Saaeed Shaheen (2003 and 2005 3000m steeplechase). At the 2010 IAAF World Half Marathon Championships in Nanning, his athletes Florence Kiplagat and Wilson Kiprop became world champions in a 22-minute period. 

At the 2011 Boston Marathon, Moses Mosop finished in 2:03:06, the fastest debut marathon of all-time and the second-fastest marathon in history at the time. On 3 June 2011 Mosop set both the 25000m (1:12:25.4) and 30000m (1:26:47.4) world records in a special race at the Prefontaine Classic in Eugene, Oregon.

On 16 February 2014 in Barcelona, his athlete Florence Kiplagat set world records at 20 km (1:01:56) and half-marathon (1:05:12). At the same race on 15 February 2015, she set 3 world records in the same race: 15 km (46:14), previously held by Tirunesh Dibaba (46:26), and her two records of 20 km (1:01:54) and half-marathon (1:05:09). 

Canova's latest athletes to win world championships were Caleb Ndiku (2014 World Indoor Championships 3000m), Irene Cheptai (World Cross Country Championships 2017 in Kampala) and Geoffrey Kirui (World Marathon Champion 2017 in London).

In 2007, his athletes obtained silver medals at the World Cross Country Championships (Moses Mosop), and in the World Championships Marathon (Mubarak Shami).

His athletes have won several Marathon Majors. In 2016, for the first time, two athletes coached by the same coach (Abel Kirui and Florence Kiplagat) were the winner of Chicago Marathon, one of the historic classic races of 42 km. In 2017, Geoffrey Kirui won Boston, and became the only athlete in the athletic history able to win WCh after winning Boston.

Canova started working for the Italian athletics federation (FIDAL) in 1971. His first position was as national coach of the 400m and 4 × 400m relay events. During this time he was involved in the training of 800m world record setter Marcello Fiasconaro, the first to run under 1:44 for the distance. From 1976-1985 he was national coach of multi-events. In 1986 he became responsible for the Italian marathon team, along with his good friend Luciano Gigliotti, coach of Olympic gold medalists Gelindo Bordin (1988) and Stefano Baldini (2004). Directly responsible for female runners, his athletes in this period included Ornella Ferrara (1995 World Championships marathon bronze medalist), Maria Curatolo (1987 World Road Race Championships 15 km bronze medalist and 1994 European Championships marathon silver medalist) and Maura Viceconte (1998 European Championships marathon bronze medalist). His last position with FIDAL was Technical Scientific Director, which he held until 2002.

He is a lecturer for the IAAF, and is frequently invited to speak in international congresses about the training methodology.

In 2004, following the change of citizenship of his athlete Stephen Cherono from Kenya to Qatar (new name Saaeed Saif Shaheen), he became the head coach for middle and long distances in Qatar, a position he maintained until the 2010 Asian Games, when he resigned and went back to Italy.

In September 2013, the Chinese Federation appointed him as national head coach for middle and long distances, including marathon, for both men and women.

At the beginning of November 2015, he resigned from this position, in spite of having a contract until the end of 2016, since it was not possible to change the Chinese organization for the specialisms of endurance, following his plan.

At the beginning of 2016 he returned to Kenya, creating a group of track runners of international level, managed by different agents. 
Canova's training system is based on increasing race-specific endurance. His Fundamental Period begins with high volume and low-intensity running along with uphill sprints and technical exercises. During the Special Period, training sessions move toward speeds that are closer to the athlete's goal race pace but still relatively far away. In the final Specific Period, all sessions focus on speeds only slightly slower and faster than race pace but with a goal of performing more and more work in each session. Throughout the training cycle, more and more recovery sessions are included as hard session become longer and more fatiguing.  Because of this, Canova very rarely uses weekly or even bi-weekly training cycles in favor of adapting to the effect of each individual session.

References

Interview: Renato Canova from Men's Racing
Renato Canova: The Wizard From Italy from Running Times

Italian athletics coaches
1944 births
Living people
Sportspeople from Turin